Victor Anatol'evich Turchin – (born 12 October 1955) – is a Ukrainian swimming coach, best known for training multiple world gold medalist Oleg Lisogor through the 1990s to the early 2000s in his hometown Brovary. Likewise, Victor Turchin has many different swimmers and to sum up they took part in World University Games and won 38 gold, 20 silver, 14 bronze medals.

Career
 1979–1986 – worked in university of Academy of Sciences of the USSR
 1986 – coach swim school in Brovary, Kiyv region
 1993 – Higher university of sport management
 1998 – worked in republic SVSM (School of higher sport skills)

References
 Victor Turchin
 Ukraine swimming coach
 Victor Turchin got award
 Takes part in Olympic Games TV programme
 Victor Turchin is preparing Russian swimmers for the Olympic Games
 Attended Khabarovski region with his lection

1955 births
Living people
Swimming coaches
Sportspeople from Baku